The State Capital Investment Corporation (SCIC) is a state-owned holding company considered a National Wealth Fund of Vietnam. It was established on 20 June 2005 under the mandate of Prime Minister Phan Văn Khải as part of a range of reforms aimed at enhancing the efficiency of state capital utilisation.

SCIC was created was to reduce investment in domestic companies and government divisions in the Vietnamese government, and to diversify their holdings. The SCIC has a chartered capital base of about VND 5 trillion (equivalent to $315 million). The SCIC commenced operation in August 2006, and as of 30 May 2012 has around 416 linked firms in their portfolio.

Board Members
SCIC board members include:
 Trần Văn Hiếu – Chairman and vice minister of finance
 Lại Văn Đạo – Chief Executive Officer
 Đỗ Hữu Hào – Board member and vice minister of industry and trade
 Cao Viết Sinh – Board member and vice minister of investment and planning
 Hoàng Nguyên Học – Board member and deputy general director
 Nguyễn Quốc Huy – Board member and deputy general director
 Lê Song Lai – Board member and deputy general director
 Nhữ Thị Hồng Liên– Board member and deputy general director

References

External links
State Capital Investment Corporation

Finance in Vietnam
Government-owned companies of Vietnam
Sovereign wealth funds
Investment promotion agencies